Bonsack is a surname. Notable people with the surname include:

James Albert Bonsack (1859–1924), American inventor
Klaus Bonsack (1941–2023), East German luger
Rose Mary Hatem Bonsack (1933–2020), American politician

See also
Bonsack, Virginia, unincorporated community in eastern Roanoke County, Virginia, United States